Thabile Sylvia Masondo is a South African politician who was elected to the National Assembly of South Africa at the 2019 general election as a member of the African National Congress.

Masondo is a member of the Committee on Multi-Party Women's Caucus and the Portfolio Committee on Women, Youth and Persons with Disabilities.

References

External links

Living people
Year of birth missing (living people)
Place of birth missing (living people)
People from Mpumalanga
Members of the National Assembly of South Africa
African National Congress politicians
Women members of the National Assembly of South Africa